Guiomar is both a name and a surname found in France, Spain and Portugal. It originated in the north of France during Medieval times, from the fictional character Guiomar, which is found in the Arthurian legends. This name could derive from uuiu (cf. gwiw) which means worthy in Old Breton and marc'h (cf. marc'h) which means horse in Breton. 

Notable people with the name include:

Giomar Guevara (born 1972), Venezuelan baseball player
Guiomar Pedruco (born 1974), 1st Winner of Miss Macau, 1996.

Guiomar Novaes (1895–1979), Brazilian pianist
Guiomar Madalena de Sá e Vilhena (1705–1789), Portuguese businessperson from Madeira
Pilar de Valderrama (1889–1979), Spanish poet and playwright, nicknamed Guiomar by poet Antonio Machado

Notable people with the surname include:

Ana Guiomar (born 1988), Portuguese actress
Johan Nilsson Guiomar (born 1985), Swedish footballer
Julien Guiomar (1928–2010), French actor
Maria Guiomar (1664 – 1728), Siamese cook
Michel Guiomar (1921–2013), French writer and philosopher

Surnames of Breton origin
Surnames of Portuguese origin
Spanish feminine given names
Portuguese feminine given names